The Grand Prix of Sonoma was a sports car race held at Sonoma Raceway (formerly Sears Point Raceway and Infineon Raceway) in Sonoma, California. It began in 1976 as an IMSA GT Championship race, before joining the American Le Mans Series from 1999 to 2005.  It was a Grand-Am Rolex Sports Car Series race from 2006 to 2008.

Winners

*Daytona Prototypes only.

External links
World Sports Racing Prototypes: IMSA archive
Racing Sports Cars: Sears Point archive
Ultimate Racing History: Sears Point archive

 
Recurring sporting events established in 1976
Recurring sporting events disestablished in 2008
1976 establishments in California
2008 disestablishments in California